Greigia sphacelata is a plant species in the genus Greigia. This species is endemic to Chile.  It produces edible fruits, known as 'chupones'.

See Also
Fascicularia bicolor
Ochagavia litoralis
Puya chilensis
Richea pandanifolia

References

Chilean Bromeliaceae: diversity, distribution and evaluation of conservation status (Published online: 10 March 2009)

sphacelata
Endemic flora of Chile